Edwar Manuel López Gómez (born 9 May 1995) is a Colombian professional footballer who plays as a forward for Club Olimpia.

Career
López had youth stints with Dim Uraba, Atlético Nacional, Sampema and Sportiva Camilo Zuniga prior to beginning his senior career with América Pedro Sellares in 2015. Later that year, he moved to Portugal with Sanjoanense, making his bow in the Campeonato de Portugal on 20 September during a win away to over Bustelo; he also scored his first goal in the process, netting an 89th-minute winner as Sanjoanense won 1–2. Five further goals followed for López in the 2015–16 season. Ahead of 2016–17, López joined Lusitano VRSA. He again netted on his debut against Armacenenses, on the way to three across ten games.

In February 2017, López agreed to join Categoría Primera B's Orsomarso of Colombia. A year after, López secured a move to Categoría Primera A's Atlético Huila. Having participated in thirty-six fixtures and scored thirteen times in all competitions in 2018, López signed a pre-contract with Argentine Primera División side Estudiantes on 27 November; effective from January 2019.

Career statistics
.

References

External links

1995 births
Living people
People from Apartadó
Colombian footballers
Association football forwards
Colombian expatriate footballers
Expatriate footballers in Portugal
Expatriate footballers in Argentina
Colombian expatriate sportspeople in Portugal
Colombian expatriate sportspeople in Argentina
Campeonato de Portugal (league) players
Categoría Primera B players
Categoría Primera A players
Argentine Primera División players
A.D. Sanjoanense players
Lusitano F.C. (Portugal) players
Orsomarso S.C. footballers
Atlético Huila footballers
Estudiantes de La Plata footballers
Argentinos Juniors footballers
Sportspeople from Antioquia Department
21st-century Colombian people